Moritz von Rohr  (4 April 1868 – 20 June 1940) was an optical scientist at Carl Zeiss in Jena, Germany.  

A street in Jena is named after him: Moritz-von-Rohr-Straße, near Carl-Zeiss-Promenade and Otto-Schott-Straße.

Life

Moritz von Rohr was born in Lonzyn near Hohensalza, then part of the Prussian Grand Duchy of Posen, but now in Poland and known as Łążyn, near Inowrocław. He obtained a doctorate of philosophy at the University of Berlin in 1892.

Inventions
Von Rohr is usually credited with the design of the first aspheric lenses for eyeglasses. He invented the eyeglass lens designs that became the Zeiss Punktal lenses.

He also developed a method of computing depth of field from a camera's entrance pupil location and diameter, without reference to focal length and f-number (see his 1904 and 1906 books). He says, "At this point it will be sufficient to note that all these formulae involve quantities relating exclusively to the entrance-pupil and its position with respect to the object-point, whereas the focal length of the transforming system does not enter into them." T. R. Dallmeyer refers to Von Rohr’s "interpretation" of depth of field in his 1899 book Telephotography.

Publications

According to the Focal Encyclopedia of Photography (1965), "A bibliography of his 571 books and articles was published in Forschungen zur Geschichte der Optik, 1943."

Von Rohr wrote several books on optics, optical instruments, and photographic lenses, in German.

 1899 Theorie und Geschichte Des Photographischen Objecktivs, Berlin: Verlag von Julius Springer
 1904 (editor) Die Bilderzeugung in optischen Instrumenten vom Standpunkte der geometrischen Optik, Berlin: J. Springer
 1906, 1911 Die optischen Instrumente, Leipzig: B. G. Teubner
 1920 Die binokularen Instrumente, Berlin: J. Springer

The 1899 book was reprinted: Sources of Modern Photography series, New York: Arno Press, 1979. 

The 1904 book was translated into English:
 1920 Geometrical Investigation of the Formation of Images in Optical Instruments, London: H. M. Stationery Office

In 1936 he published a retrospective, "The First Jena Catalogue of Optical Glasses Published in 1886", in Supplement to "Current Science", which is available online.

Photographs
Photographs of von Rohr and more information about him are available on the Zeiss website and the AntiqueSpectacles site.

References

External links
Page images: Prof. Dr. Moritz von Rohr, "The First Jena Catalogue of Optical Glasses Published in 1886", Supplement to "Current Science", Vol. 5, July 1936.

1868 births
1940 deaths
Scientists from Jena
People from Toruń County